Traumatic anserine folliculosis is a curious gooseflesh-like follicular hyperkeratosis that may result from persistent pressure and lateral friction of one skin surface against another.

See also 
 List of cutaneous conditions

References

 
Conditions of the skin appendages